Omar E. López (born January 3, 1977) is a Venezuelan former professional baseball player and coach, scout, and manager in Minor League Baseball (MiLB).  He is the first base coach for the Houston Astros of Major League Baseball (MLB), a role in which he has served since 2020.  López has worked in the Astros' organization since 1999.

Baseball career

From Valencia, Carabobo, Venezuela, Omar López played as a third baseman in Minor League Baseball for the Chicago White Sox organization in 1996 and 1997 and for the Arizona Diamondbacks organization in 1998.  He then joined the Houston Astros organization in 1999 as a scout and hitting and infield instructor in Venezuela and worked in that capacity until 2007.  One player that he recommended to the club to sign was a 16-year-old José Altuve.

From 2008 to 2019, López managed in Minor League Baseball for various Astros' affiliates.  While leading the Gulf Coast League (GCL) Astros in 2010, he was named the Astros' Player Development Man of the Year.  In 2013, he led the High-A Quad Cities River Bandits to an 81–57 record and the Midwest League championship.

During the 2014–15 season in the Venezuelan Professional Baseball League (Liga Venezolana de Béisbol Profesional, LVBP), López managed the Caribes de Anzoátegui, and, at age 38, was the youngest in the league among his peers.  He led the Caribes to the LVBP championship and earned the Manager of the Year Award.

In his most recent minor league managerial post, López guided the Corpus Christi Hooks of the Class AA Texas League in 2018 and 2019.  In 2018, he led the Hooks to an 82–56 record, a postseason qualification, and earned Texas League Manager of the Year honors.

The Astros promoted him to the major league coaching staff as first base coach before the 2020 season.

The World Baseball Classic (WBC) announced on August 17, 2022, that López was named manager of the Venezuela national team for the 2023 WBC tournament.

In 2022, the Astros won 106 games, the second-highest total in franchise history.  They advanced to the World Series and defeated the Philadelphia Phillies in six games to give López his first career World Series title.

During the 2023 WBC, López won his debut as Team Venezuela's manager in a 5–1 victory over the Dominican Republic.

References

External links

Living people
1977 births
People from Valencia, Venezuela
Houston Astros coaches
Major League Baseball first base coaches
Bristol White Sox players
South Bend Silver Hawks players